Leonidas Smolents, Smolenits or Smolenskis (1806–1882) was an Austrian army officer of Greek origin, who after 1830 settled in the newly independent Kingdom of Greece and became a general and Minister for Military Affairs.

Career
Leonidas Smolents was born in 1806 in Pest, Hungary, and grew up in Vienna. He was the great-grandson of Simon Smolenic, a merchant of Greek descent from Moscopole who had settled in Hungary, become wealthy, and been ennobled by Francis II of the Holy Roman Empire in 1797 as an Imperial Knight with the surname "von Smolik". After completing military studies at the Theresian Military Academy, he was commissioned into the Imperial Austrian Army as a second lieutenant of the engineers in 1822. In 1822–1824 he participated in the Austrian occupation of the Kingdom of the Two Sicilies.

In 1825, with the Greek War of Independence in full swing, he resigned and tried to come to Greece, but was prevented by the Austrian government. He finally managed to come to Greece in 1830, joining the nascent Greek Army as a lieutenant of engineers under Governor Ioannis Kapodistrias.

Under King Otto of Greece, he gradually climbed the military hierarchy, although after the 3 September 1843 Revolution, due to his foreign name he was exposed to the ire of the populace against the Bavarian officers that had dominated the state in the first decade of Otto's rule; the founder of the National Bank of Greece, Georgios Stavros, and two others who had known him in Vienna had to issue a certificate testifying to his Greek origin. Nevertheless, in the National Assembly elected to draft the Greek Constitution of 1843, he was elected as representative of Attica. 

He served as Minister for Military Affairs in the Dimitrios Voulgaris cabinet of 1855–1857. He particularly distinguished himself in the combating of the banditry endemic in the country, resulting in the arrest of 313 bandits, the surrender of 35, the death of 156, and the capture of 117 dealers in stolen goods. King Otto decorated him with the Commander's Cross of the Order of the Redeemer. 

Under King George I of Greece, he was promoted to major general, and served again as Minister for Military Affairs in the cabinets of Zinovios Valvis (1863), Thrasyvoulos Zaimis (1870) and Alexandros Koumoundouros (1871). He also was appointed twice as overall military commander of the Peloponnese and once of Attica, as well as serving as army inspector and president of the Revisionary Military Tribunal.

He died at Athens on 21 April 1882.

Family
Leonidas Smolents married Maria Axioti, daughter of a distinguished military officer and politician Konstantinos Axiotis. The couple had two sons:  and Konstantinos Smolenskis, both of whom became army officers, generals and Ministers for Military Affairs.

References

Sources 
 
 

1806 births
1882 deaths
Hellenic Army major generals
Members of the Hellenic Parliament
Ministers of Military Affairs of Greece
Military personnel from Vienna
Greek people of Aromanian descent
19th-century Austrian military personnel
19th-century Greek military personnel
Austrian emigrants to Greece